Duboka (rom. Adâncata) is a village in the municipality of Kučevo (rom. Cuciova), Serbia. According to the 2002 census, the village has a population of 1110 people.

References

Populated places in Braničevo District